Business Hall of Fame may refer to:

 American National Business Hall of Fame (ANBHF), established in 1972
 Canadian Business Hall of Fame, established by Junior Achievement of Canada in 1979
 U.S. Business Hall of Fame, established by Junior Achievement in 1975